Presentation College, Chaguanas is a Roman Catholic secondary school in Chaguanas, Trinidad and Tobago and is the brother school of Presentation College, San Fernando.

History

The Endeavour estates donated the land on which the school is. With the concern for the welfare of underprivileged youths, Canon Max Murphy founded the school with the permission of the then Archbishop of Port of Spain, Count Finbar Ryan. It was first known as "the parish school," but was later renamed Pamphilian High School, and then The College of St. Phillip and St. James. In 1959, the school was established at its current location, and management was taken over by the Presentation Brothers who continued to run the school until 1997. On 19 March 1959, the then Education and Culture Minister, Dr. Patrick Solomon, formally commissioned the school. On 4 October 2009, the school celebrated its 50th anniversary.

Although the school is primarily Roman Catholic, it has a diverse student body of different religions. Hosted and organized by the students, the school holds various religious celebrations annually, such as Diwali, Eid, and Christmas.

In September 2019, Distinguished Alumni and reputed Chemistry teacher, former Dean, and Vice Principal, Mr. Brian Seemungal was appointed Principal, succeeding Captain Gary Ribiero. Mr. Raphael Max Ramlal(FORM 1), Mr. Ganesh Pulchan(FORM 2), Mr. Trevorn Aguillera (FORM 3), Mrs. Krystal K. Pedro(FORM 4), Mr. Khaleel Sahibdeen(FORM 5), and Mr. Darshan Maharaj(FORM 6) are the deans at the college. The Heads of the Department are Mr. Anthony Hosein (Mathematics), Mrs. Mylene Semungal (Sciences), Mrs. L. Boodoo (Languages), and Mr. Roland Hosein (Business).

House system 

The school has four houses:

Aquinas (after St. Thomas Aquinas patron saint of schools)
Chaconia (the national flower),
Finbar (after former Roman Catholic Archbishop of Port of Spain, Count Finbar Ryan, who donated the Virgin Mary statue which stands at the center of the school)
Ibis

See also 
 List of schools in Trinidad and Tobago

References

External links 
 Official website

1959 establishments in Trinidad and Tobago
Chaguanas
Catholic schools in Trinidad and Tobago
Educational institutions established in 1959
Presentation Brothers schools